Sebastián Gamarra (born 15 January 1997) is a Bolivian professional footballer who plays as a midfielder for the Bolivia national team.

Club career
At a young age his family moved to Santa Cruz de la Sierra where he attended the prestigious Tahuichi Football Academy. During a youth championship in Brazil, Gamarra was spotted by a Brescia talent scout and he signed for the Italian team shortly after. Among his achievements with Brescia he won the Gothia Cup in 2010.

On 7 July 2016, he moved to FeralpiSalò.

On 10 January 2019 was signed by Pisa.

On 30 July 2019, he returned to Bolivia, signing with Oriente Petrolero.

International career
Gamarra was selected by the Bolivia national football team manager Mauricio Soria to join the squad for the 2015 Copa America. He made his international debut on 6 June 2015 during a friendly match against Argentina played in San Juan that ended in a 0-5 loss in preparation for the Conmebol tournament.

References

External links
 
 

1997 births
Living people
People from Tarija
Bolivian footballers
Bolivia international footballers
Bolivian expatriate footballers
Association football midfielders
A.C. Milan players
FeralpiSalò players
Pisa S.C. players
Oriente Petrolero players
Serie C players
Bolivian Primera División players
Expatriate footballers in Italy
Bolivian expatriate sportspeople in Italy
2015 Copa América players